The Mental Health Systems Act of 1980 (MHSA) was United States legislation signed by President Jimmy Carter which provided grants to community mental health centers. In 1981 President Ronald Reagan, who had made major efforts during his Governorship to reduce funding and enlistment for California mental institutions, pushed a political effort through the U.S. Congress to repeal most of MHSA. The MHSA was considered landmark legislation in mental health care policy.

History
Coinciding with a movement during the 1970s for rehabilitation of people with severe mental illnesses, the Mental Health Systems Act supported and financed community mental health support systems, which coordinated general health care, mental health care, and social support services. The law followed the 1978 Report of the President's Commission on Mental Health, which made recommendations for improving mental health care in the United States.  While some concerns existed about the methodology followed by the President's Committee, the report served as the foundation for the MHSA, which in turn was seen as landmark legislation in U.S. mental health policy.

The Omnibus Budget Reconciliation Act of 1981, signed by President Ronald Reagan on August 13, 1981, repealed most of the Mental Health Systems Act. The Patients' Bill of Rights, section 501, was not repealed; per Congressional record, the Congress felt that state provisions were sufficient and section 501 served as a recommendation to states to review and refine existing policies.

See also
 Lanterman–Petris–Short Act

References

Further reading

External links
 Mental Health Systems Act (PDF/details) as amended in the GPO Statute Compilations collection
 S. 1177 (96th): Mental Health Systems Act

1980 in American law
Mental health law in the United States
United States federal health legislation